Sumbal is a town and a notified area committee in the Bandipora district of the Indian union territory of Jammu and Kashmir. Sumbal is 19 kilometres away from Srinagar (the summer capital of Jammu and Kashmir). Sumbal city is divided into 13 wards, for which elections are held every 5 years.

Geography
It has an average elevation of 1557 metres (5108 feet).

Demographics
At the 2001 India census, Sumbal had a population of 10,737. Males constitute 51% of the population and females 49%. Sumbal has an average literacy rate of 29%, lower than the national average of 59.5%: male literacy is 39%, and female literacy is 18%. In Sumbal, 13% of the population is under 6 years of age.

See also
Manzoor Dar, a notable cricketer of Sumbal
Uri

References

Cities and towns in Baramulla district